Shata or Sheikh Shata is an old city in Damietta Governorate, Egypt. It lies North East of the Nile Delta on Lake Manzala. City was famous in Middle Ages for its production of textiles known as "Shatawi"  and for producing cover (Kiswah) for Kabaa.

References 

Populated places in Damietta Governorate
Nile Delta